The Pittsburgh Council on Higher Education is a consortium of colleges and universities in the Pittsburgh metro area.  The organization exists to allow the schools and their students to take advantage of each other's resources and to facilitate sharing them.

Any full-time student at a member school may cross-register at another member school, barring certain restrictions.

Member schools
Carlow University
Carnegie Mellon University
Chatham University
Community College of Allegheny County
Duquesne University
La Roche College
Pittsburgh Theological Seminary
Point Park University
Robert Morris University
University of Pittsburgh
Pittsburgh Technical College

External links

Education in Allegheny County, Pennsylvania
Universities and colleges in Pittsburgh
1966 establishments in Pennsylvania
Consortia in the United States